David Graf may refer to:

 David Graf (1950–2001), an American actor
 David Graf (boxer) (born January 1989), a German boxer
 David Graf (BMX rider) (born September 1989), a Swiss BMX rider